C/1992 J1 (Spacewatch) is a comet that was discovered 1 May 1992 by David Rabinowitz of the Spacewatch Project. This was the first comet to be discovered using an automated system.

Using a generic heliocentric (two-body) solution calculated near the time of perihelion (closest approach to the Sun), it is estimated to have an aphelion (Q) (furthest distance from the Sun) of 154,202 AU (more than 2 Light-years). But the orbit of a long-period comet is properly obtained when the osculating orbit is computed at an epoch after leaving the planetary region and is calculated with respect to the center of mass of the Solar System. After leaving the planetary region of the Solar System, the post-perihelion orbital period is estimated to be about 78,000 years with aphelion around 3,650 AU. In 2007 it became more than 30 AU from the Sun.

See also
Comet Lulin (C/2007 N3) another comet with a near parabolic orbit
 List of Solar System objects by greatest aphelion

References

External links
 Orbital simulation from JPL (Java) / Horizons Ephemeris

Non-periodic comets

1992 in science
19920501